Saccharibacter is a bacterial genus from the family of Acetobacteraceae. Up to now there is only one species of this genus known (Saccharibacter floricola).

References

Further reading 
 
 
 

Rhodospirillales
Monotypic bacteria genera
Bacteria genera